Happy Birthday, Garfield is an hour-long television special dedicated to the tenth anniversary of the Garfield comic strip, hosted by its creator Jim Davis. It uses both live-action and animation.

The special was first broadcast May 17, 1988 on CBS and February 24, 1989 on CITV. When it comes to home video, it has only been released on VHS in the United Kingdom.

Synopsis
The program featured the people behind the strips and animated adaptations, which include
A very brief animated short made in 1980 from The Fantastic Funnies (two years before Here Comes Garfield) by Bill Melendez and Lee Mendelson (well known for their Peanuts specials) featuring jokes from the strips of June 21 and August 2, 1978 and July 7, 1979.
A recording session for the upcoming Garfield and Friends series (with Lorenzo Music, Gregg Berger and Thom Huge), apart from some footage from it and from Garfield: His 9 Lives.
Spanish- and German-dubbed clips of Here Comes Garfield and Garfield Goes Hollywood respectively were shown.
A sneak peek for the unproduced feature film Garfield's Judgment Day.
A rehearsal for the theme song of Garfield's Babes and Bullets.
A chat Davis has with Dik Browne (Hägar the Horrible, Hi and Lois), Mike Peters (Mother Goose and Grimm) and Lynn Johnston (For Better or For Worse). The last part of the program features the celebrations held for the strip's anniversary, most notably the one where fellow cartoonists drew their characters as their "presents", followed by man-in-the-street interviews about Garfield, before the camera shows him and Odie (both played by human actors) living the "good life" in Hollywood (even Garfield takes his time to kick Odie). Finally, Davis acknowledges the audience before flying off on a Garfield-shaped hot air balloon.

References

External links
Happy Birthday, Garfield at Internet Movie Database
 

Garfield television specials
1980s American television specials
1980s American animated films
1988 television specials
1988 in American television
1980s animated television specials
CBS television specials
CBS original programming
Film Roman television specials
Works with live action and animation